Paula Arias Manjón and Olga Danilović were the defending champions, but they lost in the first round to Chen Pei-hsuan and Naho Sato.

Bianca Andreescu and Carson Branstine won the title, defeating Olesya Pervushina and Anastasia Potapova in the final, 6–1, 6–3.

Seeds

Draw

Finals

Top half

Bottom half

External links 
 Draw

Girls' Doubles
French Open, 2017 Girls' Doubles